Yle TV2 is a Finnish television channel owned and operated by Yle. TV2 was launched in 1965 as the successor to the former television channels TES-TV (Tesvisio) and Tamvisio, and broadcasts public service programming, sports, drama, children's, youth, and music programmes. With Yle TV1, it is one of the main television channels of Yle.

A HD simulcast of Yle TV2 begun broadcasting in January 2014.

Programming aired by Yle TV2

In house Productions
 Ajankohtainen kakkonen
 Akuutti
 Eka & Helmi (Best & Bester)
 Galaxi - featuring cartoons for children ages 7 and up
 Jopet Show
 Kummeli
 Pasila
 Pikku Kakkonen - featuring cartoons for children ages 0–6
 Se on siinä
 Tankki täyteen
 Tartu mikkiin
 Uusi Päivä
 Uuden Musiikin Kilpailu (Finnish national selection for Eurovision Song Contest)

Imported
 Doctor Who (Revived series only)
 Ihana Elisa (Elisa di Rivombrosa)
 Ihanan Elisan tytär (La figlia di Elisa – Ritorno a Rivombrosa)
 Eurovision Song Contest
 Game of Thrones
 Girls
 Hädän hetkellä (Third Watch)
 Inside No. 9
 It's Pony
 Harveyn Nokat (Harvey Beaks)
 Häpeämätön (Shameless)
 Kahden keikka (Ein Fall für Zwei)
 Karvinen ja ystävät (Garfield and Friends)
 Karvinen (The Garfield Show)
 Kettu (Der Alte)
 Kova laki (Law & Order)
 Kova laki: Erikoisyksikkö (Law & Order: Special Victims Unit)
 Kova laki: Los Angeles (Law & Order: Los Angeles)
 Kova laki: Rikollinen mieli (Law & Order: Criminal Intent)
 Kunnian hinta (Orgoglio)
 Leiri Lakebottom (Camp Lakebottom)
 Luut (Bones)
 Matkapassi (Globe Trekker)
 McLeodin Tyttäret (McLeod's Daughters)
 Misfits
 Muistin vanki (Unforgettable)
 Mies korkeassa linnassa (The Man in the High Castle (TV series))
 Muumilaakson tarinoita (Moomin (1990 TV series))
 Nolojen tilanteiden mies (Mr. Bean)
 Ovela Pete (Sneaky Pete)
 Ollien Pakkaus (Ollie's Pack)
 Onnen Päivät (Happy Days)
 Pirunpelto (TV-Series)
 Poika Tyttö Koira Kissa Hiiri Juusto (Boy Girl Dog Cat Mouse Cheese)
 Seitsemäs Taivas (7th Heaven)
 Uusi Sherlock (Sherlock)
 Sopranos (The Sopranos)
 Taivaan tulet (TV-Series)
 The Goldbergs
 Tenavat (Peanuts)
 True Blood
 True Detective
 The Wire
 Tervetuloa Tapaan (Welcome to the Wayne)

References

External links
 Official site 

Yle television channels
Television channels and stations established in 1965